George Alfred Skelton (27 November 1919 in Thurcroft, near Rotherham, Yorkshire – 1994) was a professional footballer who played as a midfielder for Huddersfield Town & Leyton Orient.

1919 births
1994 deaths
People from Thurcroft
English footballers
Association football forwards
English Football League players
Huddersfield Town A.F.C. players
Leyton Orient F.C. players
Sportspeople from Yorkshire